Metaplatyntis is a genus of moth in the family Gelechiidae. It contains the species Metaplatyntis synclepta, which is found in the Democratic Republic of Congo, where it has been recorded from North Kivu.

References

Gelechiinae